Gozdno may refer to the following places in Poland:
Gozdno, Lower Silesian Voivodeship (south-west Poland)
Gozdno, Lubusz Voivodeship (west Poland)
Gozdno, West Pomeranian Voivodeship (north-west Poland)